Cape Spartel is a promontory in Morocco about  above sea level at the entrance to the Strait of Gibraltar, 12 km west of Tangier. Below the cape are the Caves of Hercules.

Etymology 
According to Mohamed Chafik, the name of this location is derived from Latin spartium, which is the name of a plant genus (Spanish broom).

Description

Cape Spartel is frequently but incorrectly referred to as the northernmost point of Africa, which is instead Ras ben Sakka, Tunisia. It is the most North Western point of mainland Africa. The cape rises to a height of 326 m. at the top of Jebel Quebir where there is a tower. There is another tower nearer to the end of the cape which serves as a lighthouse.

Below the cape are the Caves of Hercules. These are open to the public and they are accessible from Robinson Plage. The caves have shown evidence of Neolithic occupation. Before they were a tourist attraction they were brothels. Historically the rock was mined and this is one important cause of the caves creation.

Near Cape Spartel is Spartel Bank, a sunken island hypothesized by some as the location of the legendary island of Atlantis.

Cape Spartel is accessible from the National Road S701.

Historical events

On 17 August 1670, British ships under Commodore Richard Beach and Dutch ships under Willem Joseph van Ghent destroyed six Barbary ships near Cape Spartel, Morocco, 17 August 1670.

During the War of the Spanish Succession, two Spanish 60-gun ships – the Porta Coeli and Santa Teresa – were intercepted on 23 March 1704 by an English squadron under Vice-Admiral Thomas Dilkes off Cape Espartel, comprising the 70-gun ships Kent and Bedford and the 50-gun Antelope. The two Spanish warships, newly built at Orio, were laden with ordnance and military stores and were accompanied by a 24-gun merchantman, the San Nicolas. After a seven hours battle, both warships were captured; they were taken to Lisbon, but the Santa Teresa sank en route.
  

During the American War of Independence on 20 October 1782 there was an inconclusive battle between British and French/Spanish fleets about 18 miles off the coast, the Battle of Cape Spartel between ships under Admiral Luis de Córdova y Córdova and a British fleet under Admiral Richard Howe. The battle was required to maintain British supplies to the besieged Rock of Gibraltar.

In December 1911, the British P&O liner, SS Delhi, ran aground near to Cape Spartel. All passengers were rescued by British and French warships, but three French rescuers were lost.

The Battle of Cape Espartel was a naval battle on 29 September 1936 during the Spanish Civil War. The engagement took place between two Nationalist cruisers and two Republican destroyers, and broke the Republican blockade of the Strait of Gibraltar, securing the naval supply route to Spanish Morocco for the Nationalists early in the war.

See also 
 Cape Malabata

References 

https://pharcapspartel.com/cap-spartel/

Bibliography 

 F. Tamburini, Il faro di Capo Spartel (1865–1958), un esempio di cooperazione internazionale in Africa attraverso i secoli XIX e XX, in “Africana, Rivista di studi extraeuropei”, n. IX, 2003
 S. L. Bensusan, Morocco, A. and C. Black, 1904

Spartel
Tangier
Geography of Tanger-Tetouan-Al Hoceima
Tourist attractions in Tangier